Ivan Cardoso may refer to:
Ivan Cardoso (director) (born 1952), Brazilian filmmaker
Ivan Cardoso (footballer) (born 2003), Portuguese footballer